Bridgeport State Park is a public recreation area located two miles east of Bridgeport, Washington, on the north shore of Rufus Woods Lake, the Columbia River reservoir created by the Chief Joseph Dam. The state park was built through a partnership between Washington State Parks and the Army Corps of Engineers after completion of the dam in 1955. The park's 25-year lease was renewed in 1990 and again in 2015.  The  park includes  of shoreline, camping areas,  of hiking trails, and facilities for boating, fishing, swimming, and golf.

References

External links
Bridgeport State Park Washington State Parks and Recreation Commission 
Bridgeport State Park Map Washington State Parks and Recreation Commission

State parks of Washington (state)
Parks in Okanogan County, Washington
Protected areas established in 1955